Seo Eunsuk (born 25 September 1967) is a South Korean politician serving as the mayor of Busanjin District of Busan and its first woman mayor from July 2018.

Seo, along with Buk District Mayor Jeong Myeong-hui and Geumjeong District Mayor Jeong Mi-yeong, was elected as the first woman mayor of their respective district in Busan in the 2018 election where 13 out of 16 autonomous districts/counties of Busan, including Busanjin District, have their first mayors not from People Power Party or its preceding parties.

Seo previously served as a member of the district legislature from 2006 to 2014. During her first term from 2006 to 2010, she served as the only democratic member of the Busanjin District Council

In the 2018 election, Seo defeated Kim Yeong-wook from the main opposition party who served as a three-term member of Busan Metropolitan Council.

In 1989 Seo was the president of the student union of her college, Busan Women's College, the only women's university outside of Seoul Capital Area. In 2002 she was the secretary-general of an organisation consisted of members from civil societies supporting Roh Moo-hyun's presidential campaign and led by then-lawyer Moon Jae-in. After losing her election in 2014, she worked for then-Mayor of Seoul Park Won-soon as one of his special advisors on policy.

Seo holds two degrees - a bachelor in English language and literature from Busan Women's College and a master's in ethics from Pusan National University where she also completed a doctorate programme on ethics.

Electoral history

References 

Minjoo Party of Korea politicians
South Korean women in politics
Mayors of places in South Korea
Busanjin District
1967 births
Living people
Uri Party politicians
People from Busan